The 3d Low Altitude Air Defense Battalion  (3d LAAD) is an air defense unit of the United States Marine Corps currently responsible for providing short range air defense.  The battalion falls under the command of Marine Air Control Group 38 (MACG-38) and the 3rd Marine Aircraft Wing (3rd MAW) and is currently based at Marine Corps Base Camp Pendleton, California.

Mission
Provide close-in, low altitude, surface-to-air weapons fires in defense of Marine Air-Ground Task Force (MAGTF) assets by defending forward combat areas, maneuver forces, vital areas, installations and/or units engaged in special/independent operations & to provide a task organized, ground security force in defense of MAGTF air sites when not engaged in air defense operations.

History

3d Forward Area Air Defense (FAAD) Battery (−) was commissioned as an independent command within Marine Air Control Group 38 on March 8, 1982 following 3d FAAD Platoon's detachment from Marine Air Support Squadron 3 the previous day. Major Jeffrey Johnson commanded 3rd FAAD Battery under MASS-3, MACG-38, 3rd MAW, initially in 1982 at its inception. Later, under Maj Ralph F. Marchewka's command, 3d FAAD Btry (-) started with 78 Marines and an H&S Platoon. It grew to five firing platoons before 3d Low Altitude Air Defense Battalion was activated under LtCol Robert. C. Dodt Jr. on January 22, 1987.

From 1986 to August 1990, the battalion supported several Weapons Tactics and Instructor (WTI) flight phases at Marine Corps Air Station Yuma, Arizona, Combined Armed Exercises at the Marine Corps Air Ground Combat Center Twentynine Palms, CA, and Exercise Red Flag at Nellis Air Force Base, Nevada. During this time, the battalion also supported the 11th, 13th, and 15th Marine Expeditionary Units (MEUs) with a single LAAD section. The battalion continues to support these exercises and MEU deployments to this day.

In response to Iranian aggression during the Tanker Wars, Marines from B Battery provided critical air defense from Iranian aircraft and guaranteed the safety of countless merchant vessels transiting between the Straits of Hormuz and Kuwait.

With Iraq's invasion of Kuwait on August 2, 1990, the battalion was tasked to support Operation Desert Shield. On August 14, 1990, advance elements of the battalion arrived with a contingent from the 7th Marine Regiment. The remainder of the battalion, augmented by a battery from 4th LAAD Battalion, reached the Saudi Arabia between August 17-20 as part of the 5th Marine Expeditionary Brigade. At the time of embarkation, only 45 Stinger teams and necessary support personnel were authorized to deploy. Once ashore, A Battery (−) defended the vital assets of Jubayl Airport, Jubayl Port Complex, King Abdul Aziz Naval Base, and Shiek Isa Airfield, Bahrain while B Battery (-) was in direct support of 7th Marine Regiment.   On June 29, 1991, the unit returned to MCB Camp Pendleton after successfully accomplishing its assigned mission.

During the 1990s, LAAD Battalions began acquiring several new weapon systems to augment dismounted Marines carrying the Stinger missile on their shoulders. 3d LAAD Bn fielded the Light Armored Vehicle-Air Defense Variant (LAV-AD) and the AN/TWQ-1 Avenger Weapons System taking into consideration concept of employment, personnel requirements, training, logistic support, and facilities requirements.

The acquisition of the LAV-AD was not without opposition. Major General Lynch, Commanding General, Marine Corps Combat Development Command, opposed the acquisition due to other Marine Corps needs and the low priority of the LAV-AD. Brigadier General West, a Marine Corps congressional liaison, favored the acquisition based on strong congressional interest and the Marine Corps' "Hill reputation" of buying only that for which it requests funding. Ultimately, the decision was made to purchase the LAV-AD due to table of organization structure availability, the current threat to the MAGTF, and the probable loss of the Marine Corps' HAWK Battalions.

The Avenger Weapon System was introduced to the battalion in January 1995. The Avenger provided Marine Corps air defenders with new capabilities in a lightweight, day/night, limited adverse weather fire unit for countering the threat of low altitude, high-speed fixed-wing or rotary wing aircraft. The firing unit incorporated two Standard Vehicle-Mounted Launcher (SVML) missile pods, a .50 caliber machine gun, Forward Looking Infrared (FLIR), Laser Range Finder (LRF), and IFF capability. The fully rotating, gyro-stabilized turret was mounted on the M1097 heavy High-Mobility Multipurpose Wheeled Vehicle (HMMWV). The fire unit could engage a target with missiles or the machine gun either with a gunner in the turret or from a remote location using the Remote Control Unit (RCU). On-board communication equipment provided for VHF radio and intercom operations.

In 2005, I MEF designated 3d LAAD Bn as the Fleet Sponsor for the Complementary Low Altitude Weapon System (CLAWS). Designated members of the Battalion participated in operational training with the CLAWS employing it in support of WTI 1-06. After WTI, CLAWS traveled to White Sands, New Mexico to conduct a live-fire exercise. The CLAWS team fired eight Advanced Medium Range Air-to-Air Missiles (AMRAAMs) and successfully engaged seven targets. The CLAWS team continued preparation for the fielding of the system during 2006. On 3 May 2006, Marine Corps Systems Command elected to discontinue the program on the basis of insufficient funding and lack of necessity.

Pre-9/11 Operations
Throughout the 1990s, LAAD Marines remained ready for any situation through constant training.  3d LAAD Bn consistently supported WTI Courses, Combined Arms Exercises (CAX), Red Flag Exercises, and numerous other air defense exercises throughout the continental United States.
In September 1994, A Battery conducted anti-narcotic operations in Gallup, New Mexico with local law enforcement agencies and Joint Task Force 6 aboard the Zuni Indian Reservation.  The Marines established observation posts and were tasked with determining possible air corridors for narcotics planes to drop drugs at designated drop zones.  On 10 Oct 1994, the Battalion planned to immediately deploy to Saudi Arabia after receiving a Southwest Asia Contingency Alert in response to the Iraqi military buildup along the Kuwaiti border.  Operation VIGILANT WARRIOR quickly contained Iraq's aggressive posturing and 3d LAAD Bn stood down.

Air Defense in the Post Cold War Era
The Cold War ended with the collapse of the Soviet Union in December 1991.  The days of a bi-polar world ended abruptly, almost unexpectedly.  Washington military planners decided that the need for a robust, integrated air defense capability no longer existed.  HAWK funding decreased until the last LAAM Battalion was deactivated in 1997.  Due to maintenance costs, the Avenger and LAV-AD programs were discontinued.  4th LAAD Bn was deactivated in 2005.  1st Stinger Battery, a Cold War mainstay on the island of Okinawa, was deactivated in 2007.  Throughout the first decade of the new millennium, 3d LAAD Bn consistently achieved mission accomplishment amidst a demanding operational tempo.  During this same period, the focus of military action has been on counterinsurgency warfare in Afghanistan and Iraq. However the battalion has continued to support the 11th, 13th, and 15th Marine Expeditionary Units and the Unit Deployment Program to this day.

Global War on Terror
On September 11, 2001 3d LAAD Bn Marines were again called to action.  The LAAD Detachment assigned to the 15th MEU defended a critical Forward Arming and Refueling Point (FARP) in Pakistan.

In January 2003, the Battalion's training again focused on preparations for war in Iraq.  By the end of January, the Offload Preparation Party and Arrival and Assembly Operations Element departed Camp Pendleton bound for Kuwait. A Battery's 1st Platoon departed for Kuwait on 27 January.  On 5 February, the Battalion's equipment was embarked aboard the USNS Soderman.  Four days later, the remainder of the battalion departed March Air Force Base for Kuwait.  By 13 February, the battalion consolidated at Ali Al Salem Air Base, Kuwait and dedicated its time to training and preparing for crossing the border into Iraq.  On 24 Feb, the battalion departed Ali Al Salem for Camp Work Horse located in Tactical Assembly Area Coyote.

Prior to 21 March 2003, when Operation IRAQI FREEDOM began, the Defended Asset List experienced a variety of changes and forced 3d LAAD Bn Marines to plan dynamically.  When the ground invasion began early on the morning of 21 March, 3d LAAD Bn Marines provided air defense for Marine Wing Support Squadron 271 (MWSS-271), MWSS-371, MWSS-372, MWSS-373, and served as a gap filler for a battalion from the Army's 108th Air Defense Artillery Brigade.  The mission was to defend logistics convoys loaded with aviation fuel and ordnance that would be staged at FARPS along I MEF's path into Northern Iraq.  These FARPs enabled helicopters to provide the Ground Combat Element with more timely close air support.  As Saddam's Fadayeen put up a fight in places like An Nasiriyah, Qalat Sikar, and Al Kut, fuel and ordnance assumed critical importance and Marines from the battalion often found themselves in the midst of the fighting.

The battalion returned to Iraq in support of Operation IRAQI FREEDOM two more times in February 2004 and August 2006 to provide air base ground defense for Al Asad Air Base.  3d LAAD Bn was called on again in September 2007 to provide air base ground defense for Camp Lemonier, Djibouti, in support of Operation ENDURING FREEDOM.  Most recently, 3d LAAD Bn provided ground security for Camp Leatherneck, Afghanistan, from February to September 2010 in support of Operation ENDURING FREEDOM.

3d LAAD Bn began training to provide Air Base Ground Defense for the Bastion/Leatherneck/Shorebak (BLS) Complex in Afghanistan's Helmand Province in the summer of 2009.  The battalion was certified by instructors from Marine Aviation Weapons and Tactics Squadron 1 and the School of Infantry – West to conduct Military Entry Point (MEP), Tactical Recovery of Aircraft and Personnel (TRAP), mounted and dismounted patrol, IED sweep, and autonomous counterinsurgency (COIN) operations in January 2010.  The battalion deployed in support of OPERATION ENDURING FREEDOM 10.1 as part of I MEF Headquarters Group the following month.  After conducting a battle hand-over with 5th Bn 10th Marines, 3d LAAD Bn immediately took ownership of its area of operations.  Again displaying its utility and versatility on the battlefield, A Battery operated Camp Leatherneck's MEP, provided a TRAP force, conducted combat patrols, and trained Afghan forces.  B Battery's mission focused on small unit decentralized COIN operations.  Operating out of a small patrol base located 10 km south of the BLS Complex, B Battery patrolled through the settlements of Habib Abad, Now Abad, and Boldak.  The squad-level patrols conducted key leader engagements, counter-IED patrolling, and human terrain mapping in an effort to counter the insurgent threat to the BLS Complex.  Due to the efforts of Marines and Sailors of 3d LAAD Bn, the BLS Complex did not experience any attacks by insurgent forces while the Battalion was deployed in support of OEF 10.1.

Post GWOT
With Operations winding down in Iraq and Afghanistan, 3d LAAD continued to focus on both Ground Based Air Defense while participating in numerous WTIs and Integrated Training Exercises  (ITX-formerly known as EMV) as well as I MEF exercises such as Steel Knight and Desert Scimitar. In the spring of 2013 the battalion deployed the first iteration of the LAAD Unit Deployment Program Detachment to MCAS Futenma, Okinawa, Japan. Focus on the Air Base Ground Defense mission continued with Unit Level Training at the Battalion level. In the spring of 2014 Bravo Battery (REIN) deployed to Jordan for Exercise Eager Lion. This was followed by Bravo Battery(REIN)'s eventual deployment ISO Special Purpose MAGTF Crisis Response-CENTCOM (SP-MAGTF-CR-CENT) in the fall of 2014.

Unit awards
A unit citation or commendation is an award bestowed upon an organization for the action cited. Members of the unit who participated in said actions are allowed to wear on their uniforms the awarded unit citation. 3d LAAD Bn has been presented with the following awards:

Command Chronology

Command Officers and Sergeant Majors

3rd Forward Area Air Defense Battery (3rd FAADB)

Major Ralph F. Marchewka                                             8 Mar 1982 – 1 Dec 1982

Major J. L. Johnson                                        1 Dec 1982 – 2 Jun 1984

Major R. J. Duhon                                           2 Jun 1984 – 9 Jul  1986

Lieutenant Colonel Robert C. Dodt Jr.                   9 Jun 1986 – 27 Jan 1987

3rd Low Altitude Air Defense Battalion (3rd LAADB)

Lieutenant Colonel Robert C. Dodt Jr.                 27 Jan 1987 – 27 May 1988

Lieutenant Colonel W. P. McElyea                27 May1988 – 13 Jul   1990

Lieutenant Colonel G. S. Fick                       13 Jul 1990 – 10 Jul   1992

Lieutenant Colonel H. Attanasio                   10 Jul  1990 – 28 Jan 1994

Lieutenant Colonel T. L. Dempsey                28 Jan 1994 – 13 Jul 1995

Lieutenant Colonel S. T. Elkins                     13 Jul  1995 – 23 May 1997

Lieutenant Colonel S. H. Mattos                   23 May1997 – 15  Jan 1999

Lieutenant Colonel C. W. Hocking                15 Jan 1999 – 1  Dec 2000

Lieutenant Colonel C. S. Ames                       1 Dec 2000 – 19 Jun 2002

Lieutenant Colonel B. J. Altman                    19 Jun 2002 – 8 Jan 2004

Lieutenant Colonel M. P. Melzar                      8 Jan 2004 – 8 Jul  2005

Lieutenant Colonel S. M. Cunningham            8 Jul 2005 – 27 Apr 2007

Lieutenant Colonel A. F. Potter                      27 Apr 2007 – 23 Jan 2009

Lieutenant Colonel M. C. Cancellier              23 Jan 2009 – 21 Oct 2010

Lieutenant Colonel A. D. Weiss                     21 Oct 2010 – 12 Apr 2012

Lieutenant Colonel J. A. Vandaveer              12 Apr 2012 – 26 Sep 2013

Lieutenant Colonel W. R. Zuber                    26 Sep 2013 – 4 Jun 2015

Lieutenant Colonel M. C. McCarthy               4 June 2015 – 9 Jun 2017

Lieutenant Colonel H. R. Prokop                 9 Jun 2017 – 20 Jun 2019

SERGEANTS MAJOR

3rd Forward Area Air Defense Battery (3rd FAADB)

Sergeant Major M. D. Zenzel                              1986–1988

3rd Low Altitude Air Defense Battalion (3rd LAADB)

Sergeant Major R. Cortez                                                 1988–1990

Sergeant Major A. C. Brooks                                            1990–1992

Sergeant Major M. G. Zacher                                           1992–1993

Sergeant Major K. Hagen                                                 1993–1995

Sergeant Major J. Duff                                                      1995–1997

First Sergeant M. B. Robinson                                           5 Apr 1997 – 1 May 1997

Sergeant Major J. T. Bunnel                                              1 May1997 – 20 Jun 1999

Sergeant Major D. J. Fierle                                              20 Jun 1999 – 25 Jul  2003

Sergeant Major A. D. Leflore                                           25  Jul 2003 – 19 Mar 2005

Sergeant Major R. E. Jenness                                        19 Mar 2005 – 5 May 2007

Sergeant Major J. E. Smith Jr.                                          5 May 2007 – 6 Feb 2010

Sergeant Major K. V. Agee                                               6 Feb 2010 – 19 Jan 2010

Sergeant Major A. Rivera                                                19 Jan 2010 – 27 Aug 2013

Sergeant Major R. J. Alpizar                                            27 Aug 2013 – 2 Feb 2015

Sergeant Major E. W. Rose                                               2 Feb 2015 – 8 Jun 2015

Sergeant Major M. Palos                                                   8 Jun 2015 – 6 Aug 2016

First Sergeant V. D. Cruz                                                   6 Aug 2016 – 15 Sep 2016

Sergeant Major M. J. Brewer                                           15 Sep 2016 – 23 Jun 2017

Sergeant Major R. W. Schieler                                         Current

See also

 List of United States Marine Corps battalions
 Organization of the United States Marine Corps
 History of ground based air defense in the United States Marine Corps

References

External links
 

United States Marine Corps low altitude air defense units
03